Herbert Bryan "Workhorse" Crompton (November 7, 1911 – August 5, 1963) was a  Major League Baseball catcher. He played in two games for Washington, having 1 hit in 3 at-bats. For the Yankees, he played in 36 games, having 19 hits for 99 at-bats. He batted and threw right-handed.

Crompton was born in Taylor Ridge, Illinois, and died in Moline, Illinois.

External links

New York Yankees players
Washington Senators (1901–1960) players
Major League Baseball catchers
Baseball players from Illinois
Minor league baseball managers
Fargo-Moorhead Twins players
Zanesville Greys players
Chattanooga Lookouts players
Charlotte Hornets (baseball) players
Greenville Spinners players
Trenton Senators players
Savannah Indians players
Atlanta Crackers players
Shreveport Sports players
Toronto Maple Leafs (International League) players
Kansas City Blues (baseball) players
Birmingham Barons players
Charleston Rebels players
Burlington Bees (Carolina League) players
Drummondville Cubs players
1911 births
1963 deaths